Matti Hiukka (born 5 May 1975) is a Finnish football manager and a former footballer.

Honours

Club honours 
Finnish Cup: 1999

Personal honours 
Veikkausliiga top scorer: 1998

References 

1975 births
People from Rovaniemi
Finnish footballers
Veikkausliiga players
Rovaniemen Palloseura players
FC Jokerit players
Helsingin Jalkapalloklubi players
Tampere United players
Finnish expatriate footballers
Expatriate footballers in Israel
Liga Leumit players
Hapoel Rishon LeZion F.C. players
Finland international footballers
Finnish football managers
Living people
FC Santa Claus players
Association football forwards
Sportspeople from Lapland (Finland)